Wade is a masculine given name of Anglo-Saxon English origin 
and derives from the pre-7th century Old English verb "wadan" (wada) meaning "to go," or as a habitational name from the Old English word "(ge)wæd" meaning "ford."

Origins and variants 
The given name Wade, was first recorded in the "little" Domesday Book for Norfolk, Suffolk, and Essex in 1086 as "Wada", "Wade" and "Wado", owing its popularity to the legend of Wade, a sea-giant, who was dreaded and honored by the coastal tribes of the North Sea and the Baltic Sea.
The Old English word "(ge)wæd" meaning "ford," may either be a topographical name to denote someone who lived by a ford, or a locational name from a place known as Wade, such as "Wade" in the county of Suffolk in East Anglia in the East of England.

People
 Wade Allison (born 1941), British physicist and Oxford professor
 Wade Baldwin IV (born 1996), American basketball player
 Wade Belak (1976–2011), former National Hockey League player
 Wade Boggs (born 1958), former Major League Baseball player
 Wade Cunningham (born 1984), New Zealand race car driver
 Wade Davis (anthropologist) (born 1953), Canadian anthropologist, ethnobotanist, author and photographer
 Wade Davis (baseball) (born 1985), Major League Baseball pitcher
 Wade Guyton (born 1972), American artist
 Wade Hampton (disambiguation), various persons of that name
 Wade Hayes (born 1969), American country music artist
 Wade Helliwell, (born 1978) retired Australian basketball player
 Wade Houston, former collegiate basketball player and coach, father of former National Basketball Association player Alan Houston
 Wade MacNeil (born 1984), Canadian singer and guitarist of post-hardcore band Alexisonfire
 Wade Mainer (1907–2011), American singer and banjoist
 Wade Miley (born 1986), Major League Baseball pitcher
 Wade Phillips (born 1947), National Football League defensive coordinator and former head coach
 Wade Rathke (born 1948), co-founder of the Association of Community Organizations for Reform Now (ACORN)
 Wade Redden (born 1977), National Hockey League player
 Wade Regehr, Professor of Neurobiology in Harvard Medical School's Department of Neurobiology
 Wade Robson (born 1982), Australian dancer, director, producer, songwriter and choreographer
 Wade Sanders, former Deputy Assistant United States Secretary of the Navy for Reserve Affairs and sex offender
 Wade Schalles (born 1951), American champion amateur wrestler
 Wade Ward (1892–1971), American old-time music banjo player and fiddler
 Wade Watts (1919–1998), African American gospel preacher and civil rights activist

Fictional characters
 Wade (folklore), in English folklore
 Wade Bailey, in the sitcom Hello Ladies
 Wade Duck, in the comic strip U.S. Acres
 Wade Eiling, a DC Comics character
 Wade Gustafson, in the Coen brothers film Fargo
 Wade Hebert, in the video game Grand Theft Auto V
 Wade Kinsella, in the television series Hart of Dixie
 Wade Ripple, in the upcoming animated Pixar film Elemental
 Wade Watts, protagonist of the novel Ready Player One and the film adaptation
 Wade Welles, a female character on the television series Sliders
 Wade Wilson, a.k.a. Deadpool, a mercenary in the Marvel Comics universe
 Wade, in Disney's Kim Possible

References

English masculine given names
Masculine given names

de:Wade (Name)